Mona Pauline Lynch is an American criminologist and Professor of Criminology, Law and Society and Law at the University of California, Irvine, where she is also co-director of the Center in Law, Society and Culture.

She has also been the co-editor-in-chief of Punishment & Society since 2015. An expert on drug laws in the United States, she is the author of the 2016 book Hard Bargains: The Coercive Power of Drug Laws in Federal Court, which discusses the use of drug laws by federal prosecutors to coerce defendants into taking plea bargains.

References

External links
Faculty page

Living people
University of California, Santa Cruz alumni
Stanford University alumni
University of California, Irvine faculty
American criminologists
American women social scientists
Sociologists of law
Academic journal editors
American women criminologists
American women legal scholars
Year of birth missing (living people)
21st-century American women